Lu Wenfu(March 23, 1927 - July 9, 2005) was a contemporary Chinese writer. He was interested in literature from an early age and devoted all his life to it. He worked for many years as journalist and a magazine editor and served as president of the Jiangsu Writers' Association (:zh:江蘇作家協會, 江苏作家协会) and vice president of the Chinese Writers' Association (:zh:中國作家協會, 中国作家协会). Lu's life ended in Suzhou, his favorite city in Jiangsu province. All his work is a mirror of this old city and that's why his novels are generally regarded as Suzhou literature. He is famous for his first story Deep within a Lane (小巷深处). From then on, Lu started producing a lot of fictions and essays.

Life
Lu Wenfu was born in 1927 in Taixing, Jiangsu province. Being kept under the thoughtful and careful love of his mother, Lu spent a peaceful childhood.

When 6 years old, Lu Wenfu went to an old-style school, where his teacher was impressed by his interest in reading and gave him a formal name Wenfu (which means literary and culture), in the hope of him becoming a litterateur. During the Second Sino-Japanese War, Lu finished primary and secondary school in Taixing. In 1945 he went to live with relatives in Suzhou for recuperation and studied in Suzhou High School. After graduation, he was admitted into two universities in Shanghai. But his family couldn't afford the school tuition and other expenses. So he transferred to the Subei Liberated Area, where he was assigned to Huazhong University to study Marxism.

After graduating from the Huazhong University in Yancheng, Lu took part in the Chinese Communist Revolution in northern Jiangsu. In 1949 he returned to Suzhou and became a reporter of New Suzhou Report (now renamed as Suzhou Daily). In 1955 he started the first period of his over 50 years' writing career. Two years later Lu became a member of Literary Federation of Jiangsu. In 1957 he joined Gao Xiaosheng (高晓声, 20th century author) and some others to found the magazine The Explorers (Tanqiuzhe, 探求者). It came under great attack by the Communist leadership, for what Lu was denounced as a Rightist during the Great Leap Forward. He was soon sentenced to a machine tool plant as an apprentice in Suzhou. During the three years as a mechanic, Lu was awarded the honor of "Excellent Apprentice", "Advanced Worker" and "Crackerjack at Technical Innovations". As a result, he was deemed reformed and was allowed to write again. Nevertheless, with the Cultural Revolution breaking out in 1966, Lu was denounced once again and was sent to the fields for reeducation through labor until 1976, which experience he later wrote of as a manual labour:"I was 'struggled against', forced to confess my crimes and paraded through the streets with a placard around my neck. I was already numb to the pain, and worried about when this disaster for my country would end." After the Cultural Revolution ended with Mao Zedong's death in 1976, Lu returned to Suzhou in November, 1978, at the age of 50.

In December, 1978, Lu became the managing editor of Suzhou magazine. It's during the Deng Xiaoping reform era that he started his second career as a writer. The works reflected on the unsettled and thought-provoking memories of modern history:"Poverty, backwardness, hardship, chaos: these are not necessarily obstacles to literature. Material wealth is not the same as spiritual wealth."

Shortly after the novel Gourmet was published in 1988, Lu opened a restaurant, The Old Suzhou Gourmet House, serving exquisite, traditional Suzhou cuisine, as a way to realize his ideal of good food. Therefore, Lu Wenfu was known in Chinese literary circles for his catering business, as an authentic gourmet both in name and fact.
 
On July 9, 2005, Lu Wenfu died of emphysema, at the age of 78.

Notable works

Deep within a Lane (小巷深处)
It is a short story written in 1956, the first period of his writing career, which describes the real life of a prostitute named Xu Wenxia. She was born in the old days but now live in the newly-born China, exploring her future with a rather complex attitude. This totally new theme of writing indicates Lu's novel creativity, making him famous among China for the first time.

Gourmet (美食家))
As the saying that "Western culture is born of the relationship between man and woman, while Chinese culture has grown from the enjoyment of food" goes, the novel Gourmet is one of the highly appreciated works of Lu Wenfu. It was published in Harvest in 1983, achieving another peak in his writing career. By creating the character of a crazy gourmet, Zhu Ziye, Lu shows the tortuous developing road of our nation, making people at that time think much more about our future generation.

There are also a lot of vivid details about the customs of the Suzhou region, which earns his fictions an reputation of Suzhou literature. Up to now, this novel has been translated into English, French, Japanese, etc., introducing Chinese traditions to the outside world.

In addition, Lu himself is an authentic gourmet. He shows great interest in the folk snacks all over the world, insisting that eating is a sort of enjoyment. Also, Chinese tea and wine are his favourite, which reflects his poetic view of life.

The Man from a Peddler's Family (小贩世家）)
The Man from a Peddler's Family is a short story published in 1979, into which Lu poured all his sufferings of his life. It starts with one of the protagonist Mr. Gao, who was well educated, thinking about the other protagonist Zhu Yuanda, one making his living only by selling wonton. The story centers on the tortuous life of Zhu Yuanda, along with the changes of political background at that time. Through Mr. Gao's observation on Zhu Yuanda, the story implicitly reflects the painful thoughts of Lu on these unstable times, which still "merits further reflection by us younger generations".

Artistic value
In the field of contemporary public literary creations, Lu Wenfu represented the old generations of writers in their respective works, along with Fan Xiaoqing (the middle-aged generation) and Zhu Wenying (the younger generation). He was an old-fashioned gentleman who remained unaffected by the rampant ideological and dogmatic literature. Lu Wenfu left his distinctive literary memories of Suzhou in different perspectives, including political, cultural, economic, and personal imprints. The rich human nature and vivid inner characters showed us a picture of the real lifestyle and the authentic residents in Suzhou, an old city with the reputation of "Venice of the East", "representing some inner expressions left by literature that are best worth savoring in the historical process for Suzhou city."

Lu's success in portraying the traditions and customs of Suzhou won him an reputation of "urban root-seeker", an honour he shared with other writers such as Deng Youmei (:zh:邓友梅), who wrote about the disappearing traditional culture of old Beijing.

Chronology of works

First Period of his Writing Career (1950s and the 1960s)

1953:
Shfting the Wind (移风) (short story)

1955:
Honor (荣誉) （short story）

1956:
Honor (荣誉) （collection of short stories）
Deep within a Lane (小巷深处) (short story)

1961:
Ge Shifu (葛师傅) (short story)

1963:
Running into Zhou Tai Twice (二遇周泰) (short story)

1964:
Running into Zhou Tai Twice (二遇周泰) (collection of short stories)

Second Period of his Writing Career (After 1978)

1978:
Devotion (献身) (collection of short stories)

1979:
Cui Dacheng (崔大成小记) (short story)
The Special Court (特别法庭) (short story)

1980:
Deep within a Lane (小巷深处) (collection of short stories)
The Man from a Peddler's Family (小贩世家) (short story)
Somebody's Knocking on the Door (有人敲门) (novella)

1982:
Talking about fictions in an outsider's view (小说门外谈) 
The Special Court (特别法庭) (collection of short stories)

1983:
Gourmet (美食家) (novella)
The Boundary Wall (围墙) (short story)

1984:
Xiaoxiang Renwu Zhi (小巷人物志) (collection of short stories I)
The Doorbell (门铃) (short story)
The Boundary Wall (围墙) (collection of short stories)

1986:
Xiaoxiang Renwu Zhi (小巷人物志) (collection of short stories II)

1987:
Qinggao (清高) (short story)
Gushi Fa (故事法) (novella)
The Representative Works of Lu Wenfu (陆文夫代表作)

1991:
Lu Wenfu (陆文夫)

1992:
Xiangfu (享福) (novella)

1995:
Huzhongriyue (壶中日月) (collections of essays)
Shelters (人之窝) (novel)

1998:
Qiudiaojiangnan (秋钓江南) (collections of essays)
The love for Suzhou (姑苏之恋) (collections of essays)

2005:
Music from Deep in the Alleys (深巷里的琵琶声)
Gourmet (美食家)

References
http://books.google.ca/books?id=CNAwX9FjrnUC&pg=PA73&dq=lu+wenfu&hl=en&sa=X&ei=xpaFT7DtM-KuiQLU_O31BA&redi

1927 births
Chinese male short story writers
2005 deaths
Writers from Taizhou, Jiangsu
20th-century novelists
Chinese male novelists
20th-century Chinese short story writers
20th-century Chinese male writers
People's Republic of China short story writers
Short story writers from Jiangsu
People of the Republic of China